The Municipal District of Wainwright No. 61 is a municipal district (MD) in eastern Alberta, Canada. Located in Census Division No. 7., its municipal office is located in the Town of Wainwright. The municipal district is bisected north-south by the Buffalo Trail and east-west by the Poundmaker Trail.

Geography

Communities and localities 
The following urban municipalities are surrounded by the MD of Wainwright No. 61.
Cities
none
Towns
Wainwright
Villages
Chauvin
Edgerton
Irma
Summer villages
none

The following hamlets are located within the MD of Wainwright No. 61.
Hamlets
Fabyan
Greenshields
Ribstone

The following localities are located within the MD of Wainwright No. 61.
Localities
Ascot Heights
Bushy Head Corner
Butze
Denwood
Dunn
Gilt Edge
Hawkins
Heath
Hope Valley
Jarrow
Killarney Lake
Park Farm
Prospect Valley
Rocky Ford
Roros
Saville Farm

Demographics 

See also 
List of communities in Alberta
List of municipal districts in Alberta

References

External links 

 
Wainwright